Stanley Dover may refer to:
 Stanley and His Monster, a human and monster duo from DC Comics
 Star City Slayer, his criminal grandfather
 Stanley Dover (Arrowverse), the Arrowverse version of the character